Hambrich Hollow (also called Hambrick Hollow) is a valley in McDonald County in the U.S. state of Missouri.

Some say Hambrich Hollow was named after the local Hambrick family, while others believe the valley was named after a thief named Brick who took a ham.

References

Valleys of McDonald County, Missouri
Valleys of Missouri